A seating plan is a diagram or a set of written or spoken instructions that determines where people should take their seats. It is widely used on diverse occasions. Seating plans have a wide range of purposes.

Formal dinners 

At formal dinners, plans are usually used to avoid chaos and confusion upon entrance and to follow the etiquette. In this case, it is customary to arrange the host and hostess at the opposite sides of the table, and alternate male and female guests throughout. Place cards can be used to direct guests. State dinners have their own protocol and arrangements are made so that the most distinguished guests can have the possibility to engage in conversation.

In Chinese culture, like many other cultures, the place at the table is a sign of social importance. In the United States according to Peggy Post, "tradition dictates that when everyone is seated together, the host and hostess sit at either end of the table. Honored guests (moms, dads, and in-laws) are placed to the host's and hostess's right and then left." This can also be the source of humor.

Politics and government
An election apportionment diagram is a form of seating chart used to visualize electoral results. Often, they are in the form of a hemicycle.

Transportation 

Plans are also made for airplanes, where the objective is to differentiate passengers between the various travel classes and ensure everybody has a place.

Entertainment venues
Similarly, theatres or cinemas may allow spectators to choose their seats beforehand. A seating plan is of crucial importance for musical ensembles or orchestras, where every type of instrument is allocated a specific section.

See also 
 Seating assignment
 Seating capacity
 Table setting
 Kids' table

References

External links 

Etiquette
Diagrams
Plan